The Malayalam movie Naagam was produced by Dushyantha Movies, Pampakuda, Kerala, India, in 1991. 

The movie starred Ashwini Kumar and Geetanjali in lead roles. 

1990s Malayalam-language films